Pulmankijärvi is a medium-sized lake in the region of Lapland in Finland. The northern part of the lake belongs to Norway.

See also
List of lakes in Finland

References

Lakes of Utsjoki